6-Fluoronorepinephrine (6-FNE) is a selective α1- and α2-adrenergic receptor full agonist related to norepinephrine. It is the only selective full agonist for the α-adrenergic receptors known to date and has been used to study their function in scientific research. Infusion of 6-FNE into the locus coeruleus of rodents produces marked hyperactivity and behavioral disinhibition by suppressing activity in the area via stimulation of α1-adrenergic receptors.

References 

Alpha-1 adrenergic receptor agonists
Alpha-2 adrenergic receptor agonists
Catecholamines
Fluoroarenes
Phenylethanolamines